The English Federation of Disability Sport (EFDS) is now operating as Activity Alliance. Activity Alliance brings our members, partners and disabled people together to make active lives possible. Collectively, the charity continues to challenge perceptions and change the reality of disability, inclusion and sport. Founded in 1998, EFDS was formed as an umbrella organisation for a number of organisations involved with supporting disabled people in sport.

Activity Alliance supports a wide range of people, including leisure facilities, local and national organisations to include disabled people more effectively. Working with a variety of partners they provide insight, training, inclusion programmes and resources. They use their knowledge and expertise to help others deliver more inclusive and accessible programmes. Successful programmes include Sainsbury's Active Kids for All Inclusive PE training, Get Out Get Active and the events programme.

Disability Sport Events (DSE) merged with EFDS in 2005 and delivers the events programme for the charity. DSE was formerly known as Disability Sport England (DSE) and originally as the British Sports Association for the Disabled (BSAD).

Its head office is based at Loughborough in England and is a registered charity.

References

External links
Official site

Charities based in Leicestershire
Parasports in England
Parasports organizations
1998 establishments in England
Sport in Loughborough
Sports organizations established in 1998
Disability organisations based in England